Oboyansky District is an administrative and municipal district (raion), one of the twenty-eight in Kursk Oblast, Russia. It is located in the south of the oblast. Its administrative center is the town of Oboyan. Population:  35,815 (2002 Census);  The population of Oboyan accounts for 42.4% of the district's total population.

Geography
Oboyansky District is located in the south central region of Kursk Oblast on the border with Belgorod Oblast. The terrain is hilly plain on the Central Russian Upland. The main river in the district is the Psel River, which flows south from the district into Ukraine, where it empties into the Dnieper River. The Psel is typically frozen from November to March. The administrative center is the town of Oboyan.

The district is bordered on the north by Medvensky District, on the east by Pristensky District, on the south by Ivnyansky District of Belgorod Oblast, and on the west by Belovsky District.

References

Notes

Sources

External links
Oboyansky District on Google Maps
Oboyansky District on OpenStreetMap

Districts of Kursk Oblast